The fifth season of the American fictional drama television series ER first aired on September 24, 1998, and concluded on May 20, 1999.  The fifth season consists of 22 episodes.

Plot 
Medical student Lucy Knight (Kellie Martin) begins her studies in the ER. As she spends time learning the layout and staff of the ER, we learn of Dr. Anna Del Amico's departure. Carter is reminded of himself as he watches Knight learn and practice. The two have a large number of conflicts before they find a way to work together. Elizabeth Corday begins her surgical internship all over again in order to keep her job at the hospital, and ends her relationship with fellow surgeon Peter Benton. Benton finds out that his son is hearing impaired, and he considers a cochlear implant. Eventually, he decides against it. Kerry Weaver applies for a full-time chief of emergency medicine post, but the post goes to an East Coast doctor, Amanda Lee. Dr. Lee soon develops a more-than-professional interest in Mark Greene with Lee being revealed to be a fraudulent psychopath who later leaves under cloudy circumstances.

Greene does a paramedic ride-along, and Doug Ross has at last settled down with Carol Hathaway. While on probation after performing a risky procedure during the fourth season, Ross breaks protocol again by informing a mother how to alter the medication given to her disabled son. She uses this information to kill her son, leaving Ross under fire. He resigns and moves to Seattle.

Production
Original executive producers John Wells and Michael Crichton reprised their roles. Lydia Woodward, Carol Flint, and Christopher Chulack all returned as executive producers. Flint left the crew with the close of the fifth season. Co-executive producer Walon Green returned for the fifth season but left the series mid-season. Fourth season producer Neal Baer and fourth season co-producer Jack Orman were promoted to supervising producers for the fifth season. Fourth season producer Penny Adams and co-producers Wendy Spence Rosato, Richard Thorpe, and Michael Salamunovich all returned to their roles. Spence Rosato was promoted to producer mid-season. Fourth season executive story editor Samantha Howard Corbin was promoted to co-producer for the fifth season but left the crew mid-season. She was replaced as co-producer by regular director Jonathan Kaplan. 

Producers Wells, Woodward, Flint, Baer, Orman, Corbin, and Greene continued to write episodes. Wells wrote two episodes, Woodward wrote four episodes, and Flint wrote five episodes. Baer wrote two episodes, Orman wrote three episodes, and Corbin and Greene each contributed to one episode before their departure. Regular writer and previous technical advisor Joe Sachs was promoted to story editor for the fifth season and contributed to two episodes. Former producers David Mills and Paul Manning continued to write for the series, Mills contributed to two further episodes, and Manning scripted one more episode. Fourth season writer Linda Gase returned and contributed to two more episodes. New writer Christopher Mack wrote a single episode.

Producers Chulack and Kaplan served as the seasons regular directors. Chulack helmed five episodes and Kaplan directed four. Cinematographer and co-producer Thorpe directed a further episode. Regular directors Lesli Linka Glatter, Félix Enríquez Alcalá, and Rod Holcomb all returned to direct further episodes. Other returning directors include executive producer John Wells, Christopher Misiano, David Nutter, and T.R. Babu Subramaniam. Cast member Laura Innes made her series directing debut with a fifth-season episode. Other new directors were Steve De Jarnatt and Dave Chameides, each with a single episode.

Cast

Main cast
 Anthony Edwards as Dr. Mark Greene – Attending Physician
 George Clooney as Dr. Doug Ross – Pediatric Attending Physician (episodes 1–15)
 Noah Wyle as Dr. John Carter – Resident PGY-3
 Julianna Margulies as Carol Hathaway – Nurse Manager
 Gloria Reuben as Jeanie Boulet – Physician Assistant
 Laura Innes as Dr. Kerry Weaver – Attending Physician
 Alex Kingston as Dr. Elizabeth Corday – Surgical Intern
 Kellie Martin as Lucy Knight – Third-year Medical Student
 Eriq La Salle as Dr. Peter Benton – Surgical Resident PGY-6

Supporting cast

Doctors and Medical students
 Mare Winningham as Amanda Lee – Chief of Emergency Medicine
 Sam Anderson as Dr. Jack Kayson – Chief of Cardiology
 John Aylward as Dr. Donald Anspaugh – Chief of Staff
 Paul McCrane as Dr. Robert Romano – Chief of Surgery
 Jorja Fox as Dr. Maggie Doyle – Resident PGY-3
 John Doman as Dr. Carl DeRaad – Chief of Psychiatry
 Scott Jaeck as Dr. Steven Flint – Chief of Radiology
 David Brisbin as Dr. Alexander Babcock – Anesthesiologist
 Michael Buchman Silver as Dr. Paul Meyers – Psychiatrist
 Matthew Glave as Dr. Dale Edson – Resident PGY-3
 Tom Gallop as Dr. Roger Julian – Chief of Genetics
 Ted Rooney as Dr. Tabash – Neonatologist
 Perry Anzilotti as Dr. Ed – Anesthesiologist 
 Kenneth Alan Williams	as Dr. Thomas Gabriel
 Carl Lumbly as Dr. Graham Baker
 Stephanie Dunnam as Dr. McLucas
 Phyllis Frelich as Dr. Lisa Parks
 Dennis Boutsikaris as Dr. David Kotlowitz

Nurses
 Ellen Crawford as Nurse Lydia Wright
Conni Marie Brazelton as Nurse Conni Oligario
 Deezer D as Nurse Malik McGrath
 Laura Cerón as Nurse Chuny Marquez
 Yvette Freeman as Nurse Haleh Adams
 Lily Mariye as Nurse Lily Jarvik
 Gedde Watanabe as Nurse Yosh Takata
 Penny Johnson as Nurse Practitioner Lynette Evans 
 Dinah Lenney as Nurse Shirley
 Bellina Logan as Nurse Kit
 Suzanne Carney as OR Nurse Janet
 Janni Brenn as Nurse Kass

Staff, Paramedics and Officers
 Abraham Benrubi as Desk Clerk Jerry Markovic
 Kristin Minter as Desk Clerk Miranda "Randi" Fronczak
 Christine Healy as Hospital Administrator Harriet Spooner
 Jeff Cahill as Transport Dispatcher Tony Fig
Emily Wagner as Paramedic Doris Pickman
 Montae Russell as Paramedic Dwight Zadro
 as Paramedic Pamela Olbes
Brian Lester as Paramedic Brian Dumar
 Michelle C. Bonilla as Paramedic Christine Harms
 Demetrius Navarro as Paramedic Morales
 J. P. Hubbell as Paramedic Lars Audia
 Meg Thalken as Chopper EMT Dee McManus
 Ed Lauter as Fire Captain Dannaker
 Cress Williams as Officer Reggie Moore
 Mike Genovese as Officer Al Grabarsky
 Chad McKnight as Officer Wilson

Family
 Christine Harnos as Jennifer "Jenn" Greene
 Yvonne Zima as Rachel Greene
 Khandi Alexander as Jackie Robbins
 Lisa Nicole Carson as Carla Reece
Matthew Watkins as Reese Benton
 Victor Williams as Roger McGrath
 Paul Freeman as Dr. Charles Corday
 Rose Gregorio as Helen Hathaway

Notable guest stars

 Keiko Agena as Mrs. Shimahara
 Xander Berkeley as Detective Wilson
 Julie Bowen as Roxanne Please
 Akosua Busia as Kobe Ikabo
 Jessica Capshaw as Sally McKenna
 Mike Doyle as Michael McKenna
 Teri Garr as Celinda Randlett
 Jenette Goldstein as Judy Stiles
 Dean Norris as Clark 
 Anna Gunn as Ekabo's Lawyer
 Taraji P. Henson as Elan
 Djimon Hounsou as Mobalage Ikabo
 Harvey Korman as Stan Levy
 Maggie Lawson as Shannon Mitchell
 Valerie Mahaffey as Joi Abbott
 Marlee Matlin as Sign Language Instructor
 Eric Christian Olsen as Travis Mitchell
 Octavia Spencer as Maria Jones
 Holland Taylor as Phyllis Farr
 Terri J. Vaughn as Mrs. Gleason
 Sheila Kelley as Coco Robbins

Episodes

References

External links 
 

1998 American television seasons
1999 American television seasons
ER (TV series) seasons